, abbreviated to , is a national university in Japan. The main campus is located in Koyamachō-Minami, Tottori City, Tottori Prefecture. Another campus, the Faculty of Medicine, is located on the Yonago Campus in Yonago, Tottori.

History
Tottori University (TU) was established in 1949 by integrating five national colleges in Tottori Prefecture:

, established in 1948,
, founded in 1945,
, founded in 1920 as Tottori Agricultural College,
, founded in 1874, also known as the Tottori Teachers Training Institute,

The university at first had three faculties: the Faculties of Liberal Arts (in Tachikawa-cho Campus), Medicine (in Yonago Campus) and Agriculture (in Yoshikata Campus). The latter history of the university is as follows:
 1965: the Faculty of Engineering was established (in Tachikawa-cho Campus).
 1966: the Faculty of Liberal Arts was renamed Faculty of Education.
 In August 1966 the Faculties of Education, Engineering and Agriculture were removed to the new-born Koyama Campus, which is now the main Tottori Campus.
 The former Tachikawa-cho and Yoshikata Campuses are now used as Sanyo and Epson factories.
 1999: the Faculty of Education was reorganized into Faculty of Education and Regional Sciences.
 2004: the Faculty of Education and Regional Sciences was reorganized into Faculty of Regional Sciences.

Organization

Faculties (undergraduate schools)

 Faculty of Regional Sciences
 Faculty of Medicine (in Yonago Campus)
 Faculty of Engineering
 Faculty of Agriculture

Graduate schools
 Graduate School of Regional Sciences (Master's courses only)
 Graduate School of Medical Sciences (Yonago Campus)
 Graduate School of Engineering
 Graduate School of Agriculture (Master's courses only)
 United Graduate School of Agricultural Science (Doctoral courses only)
 Participants are Tottori, Shimane and Yamaguchi Universities.
 United Graduate School of Veterinary Medicine (Doctoral courses only)
 Participants are Yamaguchi, Tottori, Miyazaki and Kagoshima Universities.

Facilities
Tottori University Library

Institutes and related facilities

The  dates to 1923. As Tottori College of Agriculture and Forestry was located near the Tottori Sand Dunes, its main task included the study of agriculture on dry or sandy land. In 1923 it opened a test field by the sand dunes. The tradition is followed by the TU Faculty of Agriculture and the research center.
The University's Geospheric Structure and Dynamics Laboratory is represented on the national Coordinating Committee for Earthquake Prediction.
, Yonago Campus

General rankings
Tottori university ranked 30th of Japan's top 300 universities in 2014 in the ranking "Truly Strong Universities" by Toyo Keizai. In another ranking, the university ranked 44th in Japan in the ranking by University Ranking by Academic Performance among 730 universities in 2013-2014.

References

External links

 Official Website
 Official Website

Japanese national universities
Universities and colleges in Tottori Prefecture
Kansai Collegiate American Football League
Tottori (city)